Böðvar Eggert Guðjónsson (born 13 November 1969) is an Icelandic basketball executive and former player. He was a board member of Knattspyrnufélag Reykjavíkur's basketball department from 2003 to 2022, most of the time as its chairman. During his time on the board, the KR men's team won nine national championships, including a record six times in a row, and three Icelandic Cups. The women's team won one national championship and one Icelandic Cup.

References

External links
Úrvalsdeild statistics at Icelandic Basketball Association

1969 births
Living people
Bodvar Gudjonsson
Bodvar Gudjonsson
Bodvar Gudjonsson